Oskar Häfliger (9 August 1923 – 28 October 1976) was a Swiss athlete. He competed in the men's discus throw at the 1952 Summer Olympics.

References

External links
  

1923 births
1976 deaths
Athletes (track and field) at the 1952 Summer Olympics
Swiss male discus throwers
Olympic athletes of Switzerland
Place of birth missing